The September 2021 Guayaquil prison riot occurred at the Litoral Penitentiary in Guayaquil, Ecuador on 28 September 2021. At least 123 inmates were killed and several others were injured in the riot that took place in that prison. It was the deadliest prison fight in the country's history and one of the deadliest in Latin American history.

Background
The confrontations between the criminal gangs began after the death of Jorge Luis Zambrano, leader of the Los Choneros gang, one of the largest and oldest criminal organizations in the country. Zambrano was assassinated on 20 December 2020 and as a result of the incident, several groups that were previously part of Los Choneros separated from the structure and began to attack their former leaders. These groups became the bands of Los Chone Killers, Los Lobos, Los Pipos and Los Tiguerones.

According to the news portal Primicias, the confrontation that led to the massacre at the penitentiary would have occurred in response to the celebration of the birthday of one of the leaders of Los Choneros in one of the penitentiary's pavilions, on the night of 24 September. Members of Los Choneros allegedly stated during the celebration that they were the most powerful gang inside the prison, which would have angered members of the Los Lobos and Los Tiguerones gangs.

The massacre
The clashes between the gangs began around 9:30 in the morning of 28 September, when the first detonations of explosives were heard inside the jail and it was decided to evacuate the administrative personnel working there. Inmates from pavilions 8 and 9 entered pavilion 5 and attacked their rivals, resulting in around 35 deaths and 48 injuries. Members of the Los Tiguerones gang also attacked inmates in pavilions 1 and 3 and beheaded five of them.

As a consequence of the first confrontation that occurred in the morning, another retaliatory attack took place.

Response
On September 30, around 900 police and military personnel entered the Litoral Penitentiary to pacify the prison, in response to President Guillermo Lasso's announcement the day before that some pavilions still did not have a police presence. During the entry, the security forces found improvised checkpoints built by the inmates and holes in several walls used by the attackers to enter other pavilions in search of victims.

At least five of the dead were found to have been beheaded, officials said.

In the wake of the clashes on 28 September, Ecuador plans to pardon up to 2,000 inmates.

Lasso declared a state of emergency. He has been trying to control the prison system, with the prison violence completely in the hands of criminal gangs. The state has lost control and now has a state of emergency.

November 2021 riots at Litoral Penitentiary

Another riot occurred at Litoral Penitentiary on 13 November 2021. Reuters and Swissinfo reported 68 prisoners were killed and over a dozen were seriously injured during this riot.

See also
Prison riot
Prison gang
February 2021 Ecuadorian prison riots
November 2021 Guayaquil prison riot

References

2021 in Ecuador
2021 riots
2021 murders in Ecuador
Prison riot
21st-century mass murder in South America
Murder in Ecuador
Organized crime events in South America
Prison uprisings in Ecuador
September 2021 crimes in South America
September 2021 events in South America
Violent non-state actor incidents in South America
Massacres in Ecuador